"A Boy's Best Friend" is a 1975 science fiction short story by American writer Isaac Asimov. It has been collected in The Complete Robot and first appeared in Boys' Life, March 1975.

Plot summary
Jimmy’s family is settled on the Moon. Since Jimmy was born on the Moon, he is greatly accustomed to life and dangers on the Moon. Robutt, a robot-dog, was Jimmy’s companion. One day his father decided to bring a real dog from the earth. He hoped that a real dog is better than Robutt. However, Jimmy was not happy to get a real dog because he had become greatly attached to Robutt

Similarities to other stories
Quoting Asimov himself, "you may find in it (the story) a distant echo of Robbie". That story, written 35 years before, also involves a relationship between a child and a robot.

References

External links 
 

Robot series short stories by Isaac Asimov
1974 short stories
Works originally published in Boys' Life
Short stories set on the Moon